Sybil Lewis may refer to:
 Sybil Lewis (surgeon)
 Sybil Lewis (actress)